Oy Pohjolan Liikenne Ab (Northern Transport in English) is the road services division of the state-owned VR Group. It is a major bus and road haulage operator in Finland.

Freight
The company has three freight companies / business divisions:
Transpoint Oy Ab - a Finnish nationwide carrier of general cargo.
Transpoint Cargo Oy - handling partial and full-load carryings.
Transpoint International Group in 9 European countries - international freight and forwarding services.
There are 190 trucks, 453 trailers and 988 swap-bodies in freight service. Some 800 trucks owned by subcontractors are also used.

Buses
Pohjolan Liikenne operates a fleet of 292 buses. These can be seen throughout Finland. The company was founded in 1940 and carried 11.7 million passengers in 2006.

See also
Osakeyhtiö (Oy, Finnish limited company)

References
VR Group website

External links
Pohjolan Liikenne (in Finnish)
Transpoint (in Finnish, Swedish and English)

Bus companies of Finland
Transport companies of Finland